Belovezhskaya Pushcha National Park (Russian:) is a national park within parts of the Brest Region (Kamyanyets District and Pruzhany District) and Grodno Region (Svislach District) in Belarus adjacent to the Polish border. Since 1992 it is a preserved part of the UNESCO World Heritage Site Białowieża Forest, the last primeval forest fragment of the European woodlands that once stretched across the European Plain. It is home to a large population of European bison, the continent's heaviest land animals. The border between the two countries runs through the forest with the Białowieża National Park on the Polish side of the border. Since May 2015 there has been a visa-free regime within the forest for hikers and cyclists at the Pierarova-Białowieża border crossing.

Geography 
The national park occupies  (2015). The nature reserves and the national parks cover 2.7% of the Brest Region territory and 2.6% of the Grodno Region.

History 
Most of the Białowieża Forest was declared a national park on August 11, 1932 during the Second Polish Republic. After World War II the forest was divided in accordance with the Polish–Soviet border agreement of August 1945 between the People's Republic of Poland and the Byelorussian SSR of the Soviet Union. Poland reopened the Białowieża National Park in 1947. In 1957, the Belarusian part received a new status – “The State Reserve-Hunting Farm”, intended for recreation of the top leaders of the Soviet state and their guests from friendly countries. In 1991, the forest acquired its current status as a state national park.

The park's headquarters are in Kamieniuki. In 2009 the Belovezhskaya Pushcha National Park celebrated the 600th anniversary of its reserve status. All of the hotels and cafes were rebuilt and new ones were added to the park. The Eco Education Center, which houses the Museum of Nature, was built. Approximately 300,000 people visit the park annually.

References

External links 
 Belovezhskaya Pushcha dedicated conservation/environmental website
 Belovezhskaya Pushcha National Park on the official website of Belarus 
 Belovezhskaya Pushcha National Park official reserve site

National parks of Belarus
Białowieża Forest
Geography of Brest Region
Geography of Grodno Region
Protected areas established in 1932
1932 establishments in Belarus
Tourist attractions in Brest Region
Tourist attractions in Grodno Region
Kamenets District
Pruzhany District
Svislach District
Central European mixed forests